Ryder Scott Company is a petroleum consulting firm based in Houston, Texas, United States. The firm independently estimates oil and gas reserves, future production profiles and cashflow economics, including discounted net present values. It assess oil reserves and evaluates oil and gas properties.

History
The company was founded in Bradford, Pennsylvania on July 1, 1937, by Harry M. Ryder, a prominent petroleum engineer, who died in 1954. and David Scott, Jr.

In 1967, Ryder Scott acquired Robert W. Harrison & Co., moved to Houston and transitioned from waterflood design to evaluation engineering, which is the core business of Ryder Scott.

Software 

 Reservoir Solutions Freeware
 SOS Downloads
 Well Collator

See also 
 GaffneyCline

References

External links 
 

Companies based in Houston
Petroleum industry
 Consulting firms of the United States